This is a list of the premiers of the province of Quebec since Canadian Confederation in 1867. Quebec uses a unicameral (originally bicameral) Westminster-style parliamentary government, in which the premier is the leader of the party that controls the most seats in the National Assembly (previously called the Legislative Assembly). The premier is Quebec's head of government, while the king of Canada is its head of state and is represented by the lieutenant governor of Quebec. The premier picks a cabinet from the elected members to form the Executive Council of Quebec, and presides over that body.

Members are first elected to the legislature during general elections. General elections must be conducted every five years from the date of the last election, but the premier may ask for early dissolution of the legislative assembly. An election may also happen if the Governing party loses the confidence of the legislature, by the defeat of a supply bill or tabling of a confidence motion.

This article only covers the time since the Canadian Confederation was created in 1867. For the premiers of the Canada East from 1840 to 1867, see List of joint premiers of the Province of Canada. The governments of Lower Canada from 1792 to 1840 were mostly controlled by representatives of the Crown.

Premiers of Quebec since 1867

See also
 Timeline of Quebec history
 List of deputy premiers of Quebec
 List of leaders of the Official Opposition of Quebec
 List of third party leaders (Quebec)
 List of premiers of Quebec by time in office
For more lists of this type, see Lists of incumbents.

References
 
 

Quebec

Premiers, List of Quebec